Omar Emboirik Ahmed Abdelahi (born February 4, 1956) was the Sahrawi ambassador to Venezuela until late 2012, also accredited non-resident ambassador to Bolivia and Ecuador, with a base in Caracas.

Personal life 
He joined the Polisario Front in 1974, being part of the youth branch UJSARIO during the last part of the Spanish colonial period. He graduated in History at the University of Las Palmas de Gran Canaria, in Canary Islands, Spain.

Diplomatic postings 
He started his diplomatic career in 1976, at the Polisario representation in France. Between 1977 and 1980 he joined the Sahrawi embassies in Cuba and Panama. Among 1983 and 1988, he carried punctual diplomatic missions in Germany, Austria, Mexico, Greece, Jamaica, Barbados, Trinidad and Tobago, Costa Rica, Switzerland, Italy and Portugal. From 1988 until 2008, he was the Polisario representative in different Spanish Autonomous Communities, for example in the Canary Islands from the late 1990s to 2002, and between 2002 and 2008 as head of the Polisario representation in Catalonia. In 2008, he was designated as extraordinary and plenipotentiary Sahrawi resident ambassador in Venezuela. On 25 June 2009, he replaced Hach Ahmed Bericalla as the Sahrawi non-resident ambassador accredited to Ecuador. On 24 March 2011, he presented to President Evo Morales the letter of credence as the Sahrawi non-resident ambassador accredited to the Plurinational State of Bolivia.

Awards and recognitions 
On March 4, 2011, Emboirik Ahmed was awarded by the town's mayor with the Order "Gran Cacique Indio Coromotano", during a ceremony at Ocumare del Tuy, in Miranda State, Venezuela.

On February 29, 2012, during the celebrations in Caracas of the 36th anniversary of the independence proclamation of the Sahrawi Republic, he was awarded with the "Waraira Repano" 1st class medal by the municipal council.

On February 18, 2017, Emboirik Ahmed was granted an honorary degree by the University of Las Palmas de Gran Canaria (Spain), his alma mater.

References 

Polisario Front politicians
Sahrawi Sunni Muslims
Living people
1956 births
Ambassadors of the Sahrawi Arab Democratic Republic to Venezuela
People from Fuerteventura
Sahrawi diplomats